Marc K. Jenkins is a Regents Professor and Director of the Center for Immunology at the University of Minnesota. He is a member of the National Academy of Sciences.

Education and career 
Jenkins received his B.S. in Microbiology from the University of Minnesota in 1980. He completed his Ph.D. in Microbiology and Immunology in 1985 from Northwestern University and then conducted postdoctoral training in the Laboratory of Immunology at the National Institutes of Health from 1985-1988. In 1988, Jenkins joined the Microbiology Department at the University of Minnesota where he is now a Regents Professor and Director of the UMN Center for Immunology. He conducts immunology research on antigen-specific helper T cells and B cells. Along with his work at the University of Minnesota, he has also been an active member of the American Association of Immunologists (AAI) where he served as President from 2013-2014.

Research achievements 
Jenkins's research has focused on CD4+ T cells, which are cells of the immune system that control infections and cancers. His group at the University of Minnesota was one of the first to discover that CD28 provides the second signal to human CD4 + T cells. His group also showed that antigen-specific CD4 + T cells first become activated in the central part of lymph nodes, then migrate to B cell-rich follicles and non-lymphoid organs, and documented the cellular changes that produce immune memory.

His current studies seek to understand the mechanisms of CD4 + T cell activation, memory cell formation, and immune protection, with the ultimate goal of using basic immunology discoveries to make better vaccines and prevent unwanted immune responses such as transplant rejection and autoimmunity.

Community service 
Jenkins has lived in Richfield, MN for the last 35 years. He worked on behalf of the Richfield Public Schools and was elected to the District 280 school board in 2004. In 2020, he received the Key to the City of Richfield in part for his service to the community.

Awards and honors 
National Academy of Sciences, 2020
Lifetime Achievement Award, American Association of Immunologists, 2020
University of Minnesota Regents Professor, 2018
AAI Excellence in Mentoring award, 2018
Pew Scholar in the Biomedical Sciences Award, 1989

References 

Year of birth missing (living people)
Living people
Northwestern University alumni
University of Minnesota alumni